Mark Daffey (9 April 1908 – 14 April 1967) was an  Australian rules footballer who played with Hawthorn in the Victorian Football League (VFL).

Notes

External links 

1908 births
1967 deaths
Australian rules footballers from Victoria (Australia)
Hawthorn Football Club players
South Bendigo Football Club players